Gramotino is a rural locality (a village) in Ugolskoye Rural Settlement, Sheksninsky District, Vologda Oblast, Russia. The population was 6 as of 2002.

Geography 
Gramotino is located 18 km south of Sheksna (the district's administrative centre) by road. Kovshovo is the nearest rural locality.

References 

Rural localities in Sheksninsky District